Trojan was launched at Newcastle in 1795. She made one voyage, to the Cape of Good Hope, under charter to the British East India Company (EIC). She then became a West Indiaman. She was wrecked in December 1802.

Career
Trojan enters Lloyd's Register in 1796 under the name Trajan, with E. Redman, master, S. Temple, owner, and trade London-Cape of Good Hope.

EIC voyage (1796-1797): Edward Redman sailed from Portsmouth 12 April 1796, bound for the Cape. Trojan reached the Cape on 12 August and left on 1 October. She reached Saint Helena on 14 October and arrived at The Downs on 15 February 1797.

On her return she became a West Indiaman. On 24 December 1802, Lloyd's List reported that Trojan, Mann, master, from Newcastle to Jamaica, was on shore at Deal beach. It was feared that she would be lost. 

Trojan was last listed in the Register of Shipping in 1802. She continued to appear in Lloyd's Register to 1807, but with information unchanged since 1801.

Citations

References
 

1795 ships
Ships built by Temple shipbuilders
Ships of the British East India Company
Age of Sail merchant ships
Maritime incidents in 1802
Shipwrecks in the North Sea
Shipwrecks of England